Wellington Camargo do Nascimento, also known as Tom (born 7 April 1990) is a Brazilian footballer who plays as a midfielder. He played for FK Rad in the 2012–13 Serbian SuperLiga.

Career
Born in Carlópolis, he started playing as senior with Campo Mourão. During the first half of 2010 he played with Campo Mourão U-20 team, having scored 10 goals in the Campeonato Paranaense U-20, and also for the senior team, having scored 5 goals.  On September 20, 2010 he signed with Grêmio Maringá.

In the season 2011–12 he played with PFC Slavia Sofia in the Bulgarian A PFG.

In August 2013, Wellington Camargo signed with Serbian top-flight side FK Rad.

References

1990 births
Living people
Brazilian footballers
Brazilian expatriate footballers
PFC Slavia Sofia players
FK Rad players
Brazilian expatriate sportspeople in Bulgaria
Expatriate footballers in Bulgaria
Expatriate footballers in Serbia
Association football midfielders